The 2011 Brisbane International was a joint ATP and WTA tennis tournament, played on outdoor hard courts in Brisbane, Queensland. It was the 3rd edition of the tournament and took place at the Queensland Tennis Centre in Tennyson and was held from 2 to 9 January 2011. It was part of the Australian Open Series in preparation for the first grandslam of the year.

During the tournament, $10 was donated for every ace to the fund supporting the current Queensland floods, which was unfolding during the tournament.

ATP entrants

Seeds

 Rankings are as of 27 December 2010

Other entrants
The following players received wildcards into the singles main draw:
  Marinko Matosevic
  John Millman
  Bernard Tomic

The following players received entry from the qualifying draw:

  Ričardas Berankis
  Matthew Ebden
  Ryan Harrison
  Adrian Mannarino

The following players received entry as a lucky loser into the singles main draw:
  Peter Luczak

WTA  entrants

Seeds

 Rankings as of 27 December 2010.

Other entrants
The following players received wildcards into the singles main draw:
  Jelena Dokić
  Sophie Ferguson
  Sally Peers

The following players received entry from the qualifying draw:

  Lucie Hradecká
  Vania King
  Anastasia Pivovarova
  Anna Tatishvili

The following players received the lucky loser spots:

  Christina McHale
  Ksenia Pervak

Champions

Men's singles

 Robin Söderling def.  Andy Roddick, 6–3, 7–5
It was Soderling's 1st title of the year and 7th of his career.

Women's singles

 Petra Kvitová def.  Andrea Petkovic, 6–1, 6–3
 It was Kvitová's 1st title of the year and the 2nd of her career.

Men's doubles

 Lukáš Dlouhý /  Paul Hanley def.  Robert Lindstedt /  Horia Tecău, 6–4, retired.

Women's doubles

 Alisa Kleybanova /  Anastasia Pavlyuchenkova def.  Klaudia Jans /  Alicja Rosolska, 6–3, 7–5

References

External links
Official website

 
Brisbane International
Brisbane International
2011
Brisbane International
Brisbane International